Tattoo is a 2002 German film written and directed by Robert Schwentke.

Plot
Marc Schrader, a rookie cop caught red-handed with drugs in a police raid of an illegal rave, joins a homicide investigation conducted by Chief Inspector Minks.  The victim is a naked young woman with the skin stripped off her back, killed as she staggered into traffic.

As Schrader and Minks investigate the murder, the case is complicated by a finger found in the stomach of the victim. Forensic examination proves the finger belongs to Nobert Günzel, who was previously convicted of rape and assault.  The police raid Günzel’s residence, and discover a blood-stained table with restraints and bits of human flesh in his basement. They also find video equipment and preserved, tattooed skin from the victim’s back. Soon, they find dead bodies buried in the garden. Günzel then goes missing.

As the complex investigation progresses, Schrader discovers Mink has a personal stake in the investigation; he wants to find the missing daughter of an old friend. He realizes later that the missing girl is actually Mink’s runaway daughter. As the body count rises, the duo has to come to terms with their inner demons, and the truth is much darker than it seems.

The plot resembles the Roald Dahl short story "Skin."

Cast
Christian Redl - Chief Inspector Minks
August Diehl - Marc Schrader
Nadeshda Brennicke - Maya Kroner
Johan Leysen - Frank Schoubya
Fatih Cevikkollu - Dix
Monica Bleibtreu - Kommissarin Roth
Ilknur Bahadir - Meltem
Joe Bausch - Günzel
Florian Panzner - Poscher
Jasmin Schwiers - Marie Minks

References

External links

2002 films
2000s German-language films
Films set in Berlin
2000s crime thriller films
German crime thriller films
German neo-noir films
German serial killer films
Films about tattooing
Films directed by Robert Schwentke
Films scored by Martin Todsharow
Films shot in Cologne
2002 directorial debut films
2000s German films